A Game Called Chaos is a Hardy Boys novel. It was first published in 2000.

Plot 
Game designer Steven Royal, creator of a game series called CHAOS, suddenly disappears. Frank and Joe Hardy take on the case, running into trouble along the way.

References

The Hardy Boys books
2000 American novels
2000 children's books